Yobe State is located in Northeast Nigeria.

Yobe may also refer to:
 Yobe Desert Stars, an association football club based in Damaturu, Yobe State
 Yobe language, a Gur language of Benin and Togo
 Yobe River, a river in West Africa that flows into Lake Chad through Nigeria and Niger
 Yobe State University, Damaturu, Yobe State
 Yobe Station, a train station in the city of Himeji, Hyōgo Prefecture, Japan
 Dominic Yobe (born 1986), Zambian footballer
 Donewell Yobe (born 1983), Zambian former footballer
 McDonald Yobe (born 1981), retired Malawian footballer

See also
 2014 Yobe State attacks
 Yobe State school shooting, of 2013 in Mamudo, Yobe State
 Yobes Ondieki (born 1961), Kenyan former 5000 m runner